Richard Joseph Christy (November 24, 1935 – July 8, 1966) was a collegiate and professional football player.

At St. James High School, Christy was twice named 1st Team All-Scholastic by the Philadelphia Bulletin (1952 & 1953).  He also led St. James to the Philadelphia City Football Championship in 1953.  The   Christy was a star halfback at North Carolina State University (NC State) from 1955 to 1957, leading them to the 1957 Atlantic Coast Conference championship in his senior year.  With the league title on the line in the season's final game, Dick Christy scored all 29 points in a 29-26 win over the University of South Carolina to clinch the championship for his Wolfpack.  Christy scored the dramatic winning points on a field goal on the last play of the game. At the conclusion of the 1957 season, Christy was 1st team All-ACC and was an AP and UP 1st team All-American.  He was also honored as the 1957 ACC Player of the Year in football and as the 1957–58 ACC Athlete of the Year for all sports.  His number 40 jersey was retired in 1997 by NC State.

Christy was selected in the third round of the 1958 NFL Draft (27th overall) by the Green Bay Packers. Hobbled in the College All-Star game in mid-August, he was traded to the Pittsburgh Steelers before the start of the season. He later played in the new American Football League. Christy was an AFL All-Star for the New York Titans in 1962, renamed the Jets in 1963.  He was cut by the Jets in September 1964. In March 1966, Christy became the first signing of the Wilmington Clippers of the Atlantic Coast Football League.

Christy died in a one-vehicle automobile accident in 1966 at age 30 in Chester, Pennsylvania. He was named to the ACC Silver Anniversary football team in 1978.  The Dick Christy Award was created by NC State to honor the football team's most valuable players in games against South Carolina. In 2016, Christy was inducted into the NC State Athletic Hall of Fame.

See also
Other American Football League players

References

External links

North Carolina State Athletics  Program spotlight: Dick Christy
 

1935 births
1966 deaths
Players of American football from Philadelphia
American football running backs
NC State Wolfpack football players
Pittsburgh Steelers players
Boston Patriots players
New York Titans (AFL) players
New York Jets players
American Football League players
American Football League All-Star players
Road incident deaths in Pennsylvania